Merimnetria multiformis is a moth of the family Gelechiidae. It was first described by Edward Meyrick in 1928. It is endemic to the Hawaiian island of Oahu and possibly Hawaii.

The larvae feed on Kadua coriacea and Kadua macrocarpa. They mine the leaves of their host plant. Very small young plants can be completely defoliated. The mine is at first slender and serpentine. As the larva becomes nearly full grown, it eats out the whole parenchyma of the leaf and sometimes eats down through the petiole of the leaf to the stem, and sometimes also migrates to another leaf. It emerges from the leaf to form its cocoon on the surface of a leaf, or other suitable situation.

External links

Moths described in 1928
Merimnetria
Endemic moths of Hawaii